Petar Popović (born July 28, 1979) is a Serbian former professional basketball player.

Professional career
He played with Spartak Subotica and Crvena zvezda before moving to Hemofarm. With them he played the next four seasons, and won the Adriatic League in 2005.

In August 2005 he signed for the Italian powerhouse Benetton Treviso. With them he won the Italian League.

For the 2006–07 season he returned to Crvena zvezda.

In September 2007, he had a trial with Joventut Badalona. He first signed a one-month contract, but later re-signed for the rest of the season. With them he won the ULEB Cup and the Spanish King's Cup.

In September 2008, he signed a short-term deal with Estudiantes, to replace injured Martin Rančík. He later resigned for the rest of the season. In July 2009, he re-signed with them for one more season.

In July 2010, he signed a one-year deal with the Russian team Spartak Saint Petersburg. With them he won the Russian Basketball Cup.

In September 2011, he returned for the third time to Crvena zvezda, signing a one-year contract.

For the 2012–13 season he signed with Artland Dragons of the German Basketball Bundesliga.

In June 2013, he signed a one-year contract with Aliağa Petkim of the Turkish Basketball League. He left them in January 2014. In March 2014, he signed with Metalac Valjevo for the rest of the season.

National team career
Popović played for Serbia and Montenegro at the 2004 Olympic Basketball Tournament in Athens.

References

External links

 ACB.com profile
 Euroleague.net profile

1979 births
Living people
ABA League players
Aliağa Petkim basketball players
Artland Dragons players
Basketball players at the 2004 Summer Olympics
BC Spartak Saint Petersburg players
CB Estudiantes players
Centers (basketball)
Serbian expatriate basketball people in Italy
Serbian expatriate basketball people in Spain
Serbian expatriate basketball people in Germany
Serbian expatriate basketball people in Russia
Serbian expatriate basketball people in Turkey
Joventut Badalona players
KK Crvena zvezda players
KK Hemofarm players
KK Metalac Valjevo players
KK Spartak Subotica players
Liga ACB players
Olympic basketball players of Serbia and Montenegro
Pallacanestro Treviso players
Serbian men's basketball players
Basketball players from Belgrade
Universiade medalists in basketball
Universiade gold medalists for Serbia and Montenegro